The Adolphus Channel  is a channel located in the Torres Strait, situated northeast of Cape York, in Queensland, Australia.

Geography 
The channel runs north of the Albany Island, one of the islands of the Manar group of the Torres Strait Islands archipelago, and to the south of Mount Adolphus Island.

Submarine dunes (sand waves) up to tall migrate along the Adolphus Channel seabed, posing a potential risk to safe navigation.

Much of the area has dual naming with traditional names from the Torres Strait Islander people.

Shipping use
Adolphus Channel is a major shipping route for traffic passing from the eastern (Coral Sea) coast of Australia to the Gulf of Carpentaria, Arafura Sea and regions further west.

History 
On the night of 28 February 1890, the Royal Mail Ship RMS Quetta struck a rock and sank in Adolphus Channel, sending 134 of her passengers to their deaths.

Islands
Adjacent to the channel are a group of islands, part of the Torres Strait Islands archipelago, comprising:
Albany Island
Bush Islet
Eborac Island
Ida Island
Mai Islet
Middle Brother Islet
Tree Island

Ida Island is north and adjacent to Muddy Bay, while the remaining islets are adjacent to Pioneer Bay on the north east coast of Albany Island.

See also 

List of Torres Strait Islands

References

Further reading
 Gadke, Christopher (2001). The architecture of the Torres Strait Islands : from the vernacular to the 'South Sea' type [St. Lucia, Qld.]

Torres Strait channels and passages